Events in the year 1675 in Norway.

Incumbents
Monarch: Christian V

Events
 15 September – The Gyldenløve War starts.

Arts and literature

Births
Cille Gad, poet and culture personality (d.1711).

Deaths

 15 November – Preben von Ahnen, civil servant and landowner (born 1606).

Exact date missing 
Karen Mowat, heiress to the largest fortune in Western Norway (born c.1630).

See also

References